The 2022 Challenger de Tigre was a professional tennis tournament played on clay courts. It was the first edition of the tournament which was part of the 2022 ATP Challenger Tour. It took place in Tigre, Argentina between 3 and 9 January 2022.

Singles main-draw entrants

Seeds

 1 Rankings are as of 27 December 2021.

Other entrants
The following players received wildcards into the singles main draw:
  Valerio Aboian
  Juan Manuel La Serna
  Lautaro Midón

The following player received entry into the singles main draw as an alternate:
  Mariano Kestelboim

The following players received entry from the qualifying draw:
  Leonardo Aboian
  Alec Deckers
  Murkel Dellien
  Federico Agustín Gómez
  Tomás Lipovšek Puches
  José Pereira

Champions

Singles

  Santiago Rodríguez Taverna def.  Facundo Díaz Acosta 6–4, 6–2.

Doubles

  Conner Huertas del Pino /  Mats Rosenkranz def.  Matías Franco Descotte /  Facundo Díaz Acosta 5–6 retired.

References

2022 ATP Challenger Tour
January 2022 sports events in Argentina
2022 in Argentine tennis